The president of the Legislative Assembly of El Salvador is the presiding officer of the Legislative Assembly of El Salvador.

List of presidents of the Legislative Assembly

References

Bibliography 

Historia del Órgano Legislativo de la República de El Salvador 1824–2006: 1824–1870
Historia del Órgano Legislativo de la República de El Salvador 1824–2006: 1871–1900
Historia del Órgano Legislativo de la República de El Salvador 1824–2006: 1900–1935
Historia del Órgano Legislativo de la República de El Salvador 1824–2006: 1936–2006
Various editions of The Europa World Year Book

El Salvador, Legislative Assembly
Legislative Assembly, Presidents